Harlan Page Davidson (September 15, 1838 – January 19, 1913) was an educator in private education. He was a teacher and director of several schools and academies for fifty years. He founded Northwestern Military Academy and was its president for twenty years.

Davidson was a prohibitionist. He was an editor and published a newspaper in the cause of the temperance movement. It was because of his newspaper that the county in lived in became the banner Prohibition county of New Jersey. He was commissioned a Colonel in the Illinois National guard.

Genealogy and early life

The progenitors of the American Davidson family were William and Mary {Alexander} Davidson, who were born in Northern Ireland of Scotch parents. They were married in the village of Moneymore in Northern Ireland in 1707 and immigrated to America in 1728. William's parents were murdered, possibly because of a religious feud, after which William and Mary decided to go to America as a safe retreat. On reaching America William and Mary settled in Woburn, Massachusetts, where they raised seven children that were born in Moneymore. 

William and Mary's fifth child was John, who was the father of James Davidson, a soldier in the American Revolutionary War. He had a son Nathaniel who married Margaret Weatherspoon and they settled in Acworth, New Hampshire about the year 1800 and had a family of three sons and two daughters. Samuel, born 1805, was the first of the children. Samuel grew up and married Lydia Jackman of Thetford, Vermont and they had six children; four sons and two daughters, of whom Harland Page was the fourth child. 

Harland Davidson was born on September 15, 1838, at a farm near the town of Hooksett, just north of Manchester, New Hampshire. He moved with his parents to Colebrook, New Hampshire around 1840. His early education was limited to a few weeks during winter in a country public school. He was also learning to become a stonemason under his father's training. In 1860 he was seriously injured by an accident and he was forced to discontinue his work as a stonemason.

Mid life
Davidson decided at this point in his life to obtain a college education. He first attended the academy at Colebrook, New Hampshire. In 1863 he entered Norwich University, a military college in Northfield, Vermont, where he studied science, Latin, and Greek. He graduated from the university and received a Bachelor of Arts degree in 1864. He also earned a Master of Arts degree from Lafayette College in Easton, Pennsylvania that year. 

Davidson then temporarily accepted the position as commandant and teacher at Cheshire Academy in Cheshire, Connecticut. The buildings at Norwich University burned down about this time so he did not return and continued his work at Cheshire Academy. In 1866, he moved to Chestnut Level. Pennsylvania taking charge of an academy there. He afterwards went to Phoenixville, Pennsylvania, where he was in charge of an institution preparing students for Lafayette College and other colleges. He was also a leader of the Presbyterian church in that town. He was principal of the high school at Somerville, New Jersey from 1870 to 1872. In 1882 he resigned to take charge of the Collegiate Institute and Business College at Salem, New Jersey, where he remained for twelve years.

Davidson then became an editor for a newspaper in Jersey City, New Jersey, from 1884 to 1885. The newspaper was devoted to social and political reform. During most of his years in Salem, New Jersey, Davidson founded and produced the Qui Vive newspaper in the cause of temperance. It was largely through the influence of this newspaper that his county he then lived in became the banner Prohibition county of New Jersey. He was principal of Leland & Gray Academy in Vermont from 1885 to June 1886. He was then commandant, with the title of major, at the Morgan Park Academy in Chicago from 1886 to 1887.  He became their superintendent in the summer of 1888 and during the time he was there he doubled their enrollment. He was also for many years president of the Sheridan Road Publishing Company and held various management positions there.

 
In the summer of 1888 he made an offer to purchase Morgan Park Military Academy, which did not transpire. In the fall he purchased Highland Hall at Highland Park on the north shore of Chicago. It was a fire damaged 125-room hotel that he renovated and from that structure he founded Northwestern Military Academy. The renovated Highland Hall was destroyed soon after its completion, but Davidson rebuilt it. He become the Academy's president and managed it successfully where it became prosperous. He formed a "crack company", which was the forerunner to the modern-day military drill teams. In the early part of the 20th century, the school became known as one of the best military institutions in the country. 

In 1892, Davidson then a Colonel, became president of Northwestern Military Academy when it was incorporated that year. He continued in that position until 1913 when his son Royal Page took over that position upon his death. In 1915, Northwestern Military Academy that he founded changed its name to Northwestern Military & Naval Academy when his son moved the school to Lake Geneva, Wisconsin.

Personal life
 
Davidson was an ardent Republican from 1860 until the fall of 1872. He became dissatisfied with the way of the Republican party was legalizing the liquor traffic by the license system. From 1872 until 1878, he was not allied with any particular political party. During those years he worked vigorously against liquor interests and in favor of political reforms. He switched in 1878 from being Republican to the viewpoints of a Prohibitionist. Davidson was commissioned a Colonel in the Illinois National guard in 1890.

Davidson has held several political positions and was elected an alderman of Highland Park for three successive terms. He was a candidate for Congress from the Seventh Illinois District in the year 1900. In 1904 Davidson was Prohibition candidate for Presidential elector. It was rumored that he carried a gun as protection against those who strongly opposed his Prohibitionist viewpoint and might cause trouble. He was associated with the Presbyterian church and prohibition since its organization.

Davidson married Adelaide Sherman Lord on May 16, 1866. They had two children: Alice Sherman, who was born August 30, 1867, and Royal Page, who was born October 8, 1870. He died at his winter home in Avon Park, Florida on Sunday night January 19, 1913. He was buried at his former home in Connecticut.

Degrees and associations 
In 1871, the Lafayette College in Pennsylvania conferred upon Davidson the Master of Arts degree. He taught school and was a school administrator in  Massachusetts, Pennsylvania, New Jersey, Vermont, and Illinois from 1866 to 1892. In 1892, in recognition of his work as an educator, Norwich University conferred upon him the Master of Arts degree. Ultimately, he taught school in one form or another for over fifty years.

Footnotes

References

  

  

  

  

  

  

1838 births
1913 deaths
People from Hooksett, New Hampshire
American Presbyterians
Pennsylvania Republicans
New Jersey Prohibitionists
Illinois Prohibitionists
Norwich University alumni
People from Salem, New Jersey
Illinois city council members
19th-century American politicians
Activists from New Hampshire
Educators from New Jersey